was a British comic strip from the pages of Valiant. The serial ran weekly from 1966 to 1970, with a brief revival as a reprint strip in 1974. The serial was among the titles reprinted in Vulcan from 1975 to 1976. Tom Tully wrote many scripts; Eric Bradbury drew the majority of the strips produced.

The strip as it appeared in Valiant concerns the adventures of crime-fighting inventor Eric Dolmann. He creates a roster of robots that looked like puppets, each with special abilities, and uses them to combat crime where he finds it. Dolmann keeps his identity secret from the public, and when not fighting crime has a small business repairing and servicing other mechanical puppets and dolls. He controls his creations with the aid of radio controls attached to his belt. Dolmann uses ventriloquism to make it appear his dolls can talk.

Dolmann usually fights small-time criminals such as gangsters or racketeers, but occasionally joins the group "International Security" which fights the organization D.A.R.T. (Department for Arson, Revolution, and Terror).

Later appearances
Dolmann is briefly referenced in Alan Moore's Captain Britain series, where a character named Puppetman is referred to as having been killed, along with his robots, by The Fury.

A more substantial reference came in another Moore-related comic, Wildstorm's 2006 Albion series. In this, Dolmann had been imprisoned by the British government, but his daughter Penny (who did not appear in the Valiant stories, and is based on Leo Baxendale's Bad Penny strip) still has possession of some of his robots, and sets out to free him (with the aid of another mechanical creation, Robot Archie). Dolmann himself is seen briefly in flashback, and later his grave is shown. Penny vows to continue the House of Dolmann.

The Dolls
Among Dolmann's robot puppets are the following:
 Astro — the pilot for Dolmann's unusual flying device, the Dolmobile.
 Elasto — modelled on a male gymnast, this robot can stretch its limbs to a large extent.
 Giggler — modelled on a jester, this robot is usually used for disorientating or distracting criminals.
 Hovero — a doll with a jet pack, useful for "spying out the lay of the land".
 Metallo — a metal doll that can alter its shape for any occasion.
 Micro — a small, superhero-styled doll that can fly, and contains a radio transmitter — usually used either for flushing out crooks, or for when Dolmann wants to contact the authorities without revealing himself.
 Mole — a somewhat manic-looking figure with claws, drills, and power saws for hands, used for digging operations.
 Nosey — a mechanical bloodhound, useful for tracking.
 Raider — modelled on a British Commando, Raider is used for stealth, and carries a gun.
 Togo — modelled on a Sumo wrestler, Togo provides brute strength.
 Trailer — this robot has searchlights for eyes, and is used for tracking villains.

See also
The device of using radio-controlled toys was also a feature of other British comic strips, including:
 General Jumbo (The Beano, 1953–1975) — Alfie "Jumbo" Johnson is a 12-year-old boy who serves as "general" to a remote control model army, navy and air force created by scientist Professor Carter.
 The Toys of Doom (Buster, 1965–1968) — Criminal scientist Doctor Droll escapes from Garstone Prison with the aid of an army of remote-controlled mechanical toys he has constructed. With art by Francisco Solano López.

In addition, several of Dolmann's puppets resemble those later created for Charles Band's Puppet Master movies (first released in 1989), with Pinhead bearing a more than passing resemblance to Togo, Jester to Giggler, and the Mole resembling a cross between Blade and Tunneler.

References

External links
 Entry at InternationalHero.co.uk

British comic strips
1965 comics debuts
1970 comics endings
Crime comics
Fleetway and IPC Comics